Mimambrix is a genus of skippers in the family Hesperiidae.

References

Natural History Museum Lepidoptera genus database

Hesperiidae genera
Hesperiidae